Jonathon Lee (September 3, 1953 – October 3, 2004) was an American pianist known for playing in California at such locations as Big Sur, Carmel, the Highlands Inn at Carmel Highlands, and the Big Sur International Marathon.

His music has been called "a fresh blend of original compositions, contemporary, classical, popular, and...universal in its appeal." It has been sold at the Pebble Beach golf resort (Pebble Beach Golf Links) and marketed in Asia.

Lee was the "Grand Piano Man" of the Big Sur International Marathon for 17 years.

References

External links 
Jonathon Lee Official Website

Michael Martinez official website (Jonathon Lee's successor)
Article about Jonathon Lee's last marathon concert in Monterey County Weekly
Lee on The Human Club

1953 births
2004 deaths
Musicians from California
20th-century American pianists
American male pianists
20th-century American male musicians